Rahul Prasad Bhatnagar is a 1983 batch IAS officer belonging to Uttar Pradesh cadre. He currently is the Secretary in the Ministry of Panchayati Raj.

Education 
Rahul Bhatnagar has a graduate (BSc) and postgraduate (MSc) degrees in Physics. He also has a postgraduate degree in Economics (MA:Economics) and a MPhil degree.

Career 
Rahul Bhatnagar has served in various key positions for both Uttar Pradesh and Union Governments, like as the Chief Secretary, Infrastructure and Industrial Development Commissioner and Principal Resident Commissioner of Uttar Pradesh, Chairman of Greater Noida and Investment Commissioner of Uttar Pradesh, Principal Secretary (Finance) and Finance Commissioner of Uttar Pradesh, Principal Secretary (Institutional Finance), Principal Secretary (Sugarcane) and Sugarcane Development Commissioner of Uttar Pradesh, District Magistrate and Collector of Gorakhpur and Shahjahanpur districts, Vice Chairman of Ayodhya-Faizabad Development Authority and as the Commissioner of Rural Housing in Uttar Pradesh Government, and as Joint Secretary in Ministry of Youth Affairs and Sports and Director in the Department of Economic Affairs of Ministry of Finance in the Union Government.

Chief Secretary of Uttar Pradesh 
Rahul Bhatnagar was appointed the Chief Secretary, Infrastructure and Industrial Development Commissioner and Principal Resident Commissioner of Uttar Pradesh by the Chief Minister of Uttar Pradesh on 13 September 2016. He was transferred from office by Chief Minister of Uttar Pradesh on 28 June 2017.

Sports Secretary 
Rahul Bhatnagar was appointed as the Union Sports Secretary and Director General of Sports Authority of India by the Appointments Committee of the Cabinet on 11 October 2017.

References

External links 
 Executive Record Sheet as maintained by Department of Personnel and Training of Government of India

Indian Administrative Service officers
Living people
1959 births
People from New Delhi
Chief Secretaries of Uttar Pradesh